Location problem may refer to several categories of problems within various application areas associated with different meanings of the terms "location" and "locate".

A problem to find the actual location of an object:
Artillery location problem

A problem to find an optimal location for an object:
Facility location problem
Point location problem
Cutter location problem